Rummu may refer to several places in Estonia:

Rummu, small borough in Vasalemma Parish, Harju County
Rummu, Kuusalu Parish, village in Kuusalu Parish, Harju County
Rummu, Lääne County, village in Ridala Parish, Lääne County

See also
Rummu Jüri (1856–1???; Jüri Rummo), Estonian outlaw, folk hero
Rummo (disambiguation)